Roche-en-Régnier is a commune in the Haute-Loire department in south-central France.  It is best known for a medieval castle and "Table d'orientation" which points out the other visible towns and hills of the Loire Valley.

Population

See also
Communes of the Haute-Loire department

References

Communes of Haute-Loire